Dimitar Stoilov (born 1 January 1931) is a Bulgarian boxer. He competed in the men's lightweight event at the 1960 Summer Olympics.

References

External links
  

1931 births
Possibly living people
Bulgarian male boxers
Olympic boxers of Bulgaria
Boxers at the 1960 Summer Olympics
People from Dobrich Province
Lightweight boxers